A wash sale is a sale of a security (stocks, bonds, options) at a loss and repurchase of the same or substantially identical security (judging by CUSIP or Committee on Uniform Securities Identification Procedures numbers) shortly before or after. Losses from such sales are not deductible in most cases under the Internal Revenue Code in the United States. Wash sale regulations disallow an investor who holds an unrealized loss from accelerating a tax deduction into the current tax year, unless the investor is out of the position for some significant length of time. A wash sale can take place at any time during the year, or across year boundaries.  

In the United Kingdom, a similar practice which specifically takes place at the end of a calendar year is known as bed and breakfasting. In a bed-and-breakfasting transaction, a position is sold on the last trading day of the year (typically late in the trading session) to establish a tax loss. The same position is then repurchased early on the first session of the new trading year, to restore the position (albeit at a lower cost basis). The term, therefore, derives its name from the late sale and early morning repurchase.

Wash sale rules don't apply when stock is sold at a profit. A related term, tax-loss harvesting is  "selling an investment at a loss with the intention of ultimately repurchasing the same investment after the IRS's 30 day window on wash sales has expired". This allows investors to lower their tax amount with the use of investment losses. Wash sales and similar trading patterns are not themselves prohibited; the rules only deal with the tax treatment of capital losses and the accounting of the ongoing tax basis. Tax rules in the U.S. and U.K. defer the tax benefits of wash selling at a loss.  Such losses are added to the basis of the newly acquired security, essentially deferring the tax benefits until a non-wash sale occurs, if ever.

Identification 
According to the Merriam-Webster Legal Dictionary, the legal definition is "a sale and purchase of securities that produces no change of the beneficial owner." The IRS broadened its definition of wash sales in 1993. In the United States, wash sale laws are codified in "26 USC § 1091 - Loss from wash sales of stock or securities". The corresponding treasury regulations are given by CFR 1.1091-1  and 1.1091-2.

Under Section 1091, a wash sale occurs when a taxpayer sells or trades stock or securities at a loss, and within 30 days before or after the sale:
 Buys substantially identical stock or securities,
 Acquires substantially identical stock or securities in a fully taxable trade,
 Acquires a contract or option to buy substantially identical stock or securities, or
 Acquires substantially identical stock for an individual retirement account (IRA).

The "substantially identical stock" acquired in any of these ways is called the "replacement stock" for that original position. The IRS has not formally defined what "substantially identical" funds are constituted of.

Consequences 
In the United States, the wash sale rule has the following consequences:
 The taxpayer is not allowed to claim the loss on the sale (the loss is not "realized").
 Basis Adjustment: The disallowed loss is added to the cost basis of the replacement stock.
 Holding Period: The holding period for the replacement stock includes the holding period of the stock sold.

In the United States, reporting wash sale loss adjustments is done on the 1099-B form. According to Forbes, "most brokers don't report wash sale (WS) loss calculations during the year". For the IRS, taxpayers in the United States must calculate their WS losses "across all taxpayer's brokerage accounts, including IRAs and spousal accounts if married/filing joint. Wash sale rules can also be avoided by "not buying a security within 30 days of selling the same one or a similar one for a loss."

Basis adjustment 
After a sale is identified as a wash sale and if the replacement stock is bought within 30 days before or after the sale then the wash sale loss is added to the basis of the replacement stock. The basis adjustment preserves the benefit of the disallowed loss; the holder receives that benefit on a future sale of the replacement stock. However, if the replacement shares are in a tax-advantaged account, such as an IRA, the disallowed loss cannot be added to the basis and there is no benefit for the loss.

Tax loss harvesting 

Tax loss harvesting (TLH) is a technique for "generating" capital losses. It occurs when an investor sells a security that has depreciated in value. CBS News describes tax loss harvesting specifically as "selling an investment at a loss with the intention of ultimately repurchasing the same investment after the IRS's 30 day window on wash sales has expired." This allows investors to lower their tax amount with the use of investment losses. Tax loss harvesting can be done throughout the fiscal year, allowing investors to "offset capital gains with capital losses."  If an investor has more capital losses than gains in a year, that year they can use up to $3,000 as a deduction to "offset ordinary income", with the remainder carrying over into future years if unused.  Loss harvesting defers taxes, but doesn't eliminate them, and is essentially receiving a loan without interest from the federal government, assuming marginal tax rates are the same. If marginal rates are different, then there can be additional tax savings (e.g., deducting excess losses against a higher ordinary income rate in one year in exchange for additional long term capital gains tax at a lower rate in a later year) or even a tax penalty (e.g., deducting at a lower capital gains tax rate in several years in exchange for a much larger gain in one later year that puts one in a higher capital gains tax and Medicare investment income tax bracket.)

Most simply, if "tax-loss harvesting is not done properly, it will create a wash-sale that will eliminate the tax benefits of the buying and selling". The investor can employ a number of techniques to avoid triggering the wash sale rule. 
 The investor can wait 30 days to repurchase the security.
 The investor can purchase a security that is similar to the original, but that does not meet the IRS's definition of "substantially identical". For example, an investor can sell an ETF and buy another with similar investment objectives.

Most tax loss harvesting historically has been performed in December.  Tax-loss harvesting is still most common in the year's fourth quarter. The practice has been both praised and criticized by investors, as deferring the taxes can result in higher rates later on relating to capital gains.

Investment companies 

The IRS has published no exact definition of what constitutes a "substantially identical" security. Therefore, it is not clear whether or not the securities of different investment companies can be "substantially identical", even if their investment objectives are identical. As a result, if an investor trades in and out of ETFs or mutual funds with almost identical holdings, some have held that it does not trigger the wash sale rule.

For example, State Street's SPDR S&P 500 ETF (NYSEARCA: SPY) and iShare's Core S&P 500 ETF (NYSEARCA: IVV) both track the S&P 500. If an investor purchases shares in SPY and the market price declines, the IRS has not provided guidance on whether the investor can sell their shares in SPY, purchase shares in IVV, and claim a capital loss without triggering the wash sale rule, despite the fact that the two ETFs have nearly identical returns.

Methods of optimal tax loss harvesting

Mean-variance portfolio optimization 
With an initial set of portfolio weights  and benchmark weights , it is possible to do TLH within the confines of mean-variance optimization by developing an objective function that maximizes the difference between tax alpha and the portfolio's tracking error:

For each asset that is bought/sold, it is necessary to include the constraints:

With this formulation, the TLH optimization may be applied within a mean-variance framework. The solution is readily computed using quadratic programming.

See also

Ex-dividend date, where favorable tax treatment of qualified dividends is contingent on a 60-day holding period, similar to the wash sale rules.
Round-tripping, a type of accounting fraud practiced through asset swapping, resembling wash sales within a group of participants.

References

External links 
 

Stock market
Taxation in the United States
Tax avoidance in the United States
Tax terms